Georg Dascher (27 June 1911 – 25 November 1944) was a German field handball player who competed in the 1936 Summer Olympics. He was part of the German field handball team, which won the gold medal. He played two matches.

He served as a lieutenant in the Wehrmacht, and died on the Western Front.  He is buried at the German War cemetery in Lommel, Belgium.

References

External links
profile

1911 births
1944 deaths
German male handball players
Olympic handball players of Germany
Field handball players at the 1936 Summer Olympics
Olympic gold medalists for Germany
Olympic medalists in handball
Burials at Lommel German war cemetery
German Army personnel killed in World War II
Medalists at the 1936 Summer Olympics
German Army officers of World War II
20th-century German people